Oswego Meeting House and Friends' Cemetery is a historic Society of Friends meeting house and cemetery in Moore's Mill, Dutchess County, New York. It was built in 1790 and is a -story frame building sided with clapboards and wooden shingles.  It has a moderately pitched gable roof and two entrances on the front facade, each flanked by two windows.  The cemetery contains about 50 stones and burials range in date from the 1790s to 1880s.  Also on the property is a privy.

It was listed on the National Register of Historic Places in 1989.

References

External links
 
 

Churches on the National Register of Historic Places in New York (state)
Churches completed in 1790
Cemeteries on the National Register of Historic Places in New York (state)
Churches in Dutchess County, New York
Quaker cemeteries
Quaker meeting houses in New York (state)
Cemeteries in Dutchess County, New York
1790 establishments in New York (state)
18th-century Quaker meeting houses
National Register of Historic Places in Dutchess County, New York